Ballads & Blues is an album by pianist Tommy Flanagan with bassist George Mraz recorded in 1978 for the Enja label.

Reception

AllMusic awarded the album 3 stars, stating: "The intimate and mostly lightly swinging music is fine, but one does miss the momentum that would have been provided by a drummer".

Track listing
All compositions by Tommy Flanagan except where noted.
 "Blue Twenty" – 5:59
 "Scrapple from the Apple" (Charlie Parker) – 4:32
 "With Malice Towards None" (Tom McIntosh) – 8:58
 "Blues for Sarka" (George Mraz) – 6:17
 "Star Eyes" (Gene de Paul, Don Raye) – 6:32
 "They Say It's Spring" (Bob Haymes, Marty Clark) – 5:28
 "Birks' Works" (Dizzy Gillespie) – 5:56
 "Fifty-Twenty One" (Thad Jones) – 6:34 Bonus track on CD
 "Toward None" – 8:51 Bonus track on CD

Personnel 
Tommy Flanagan – piano
George Mraz – bass

References 

1978 albums
Tommy Flanagan albums
Enja Records albums